Heřmanova Huť is a municipality in Plzeň-North District in the Plzeň Region of the Czech Republic. It has about 1,800 inhabitants.

Administrative parts
The municipality is made up of villages of Dolní Sekyřany, Horní Sekyřany, Vlkýš and Vlkýš I.

Geography
It lies in the Plasy Uplands.

History
The first written mention of Sekyřany is from 1115. The village was later split to Dolní ("Lower") Sekyřany and Horní ("Upper") Sekyřany. Both villages were bought by the Chotěšov Abbey in 1253. The first written mention of Vlkýš is from 1457.

The municipality of Heřmanova Huť was founded in 1954 through the merger of three municipalities: Vlkýš, Dolní Sekyřany and Horní Sekyřany.

Demographics

Transport
The D5 motorway passes through the northern part of the municipal territory.

Gallery

References

External links

Villages in Plzeň-North District